Roja Combines is an Indian film production and distribution company headed by Kaja Mydeen. The film had been a leading production studio in the Tamil film industry in the 1990s, but has struggled following the switch to digital film-making.

History 
Roja Combines was launched and run by three separate producers in the 1990s – Kaja Mydeen, V. Gnanavel and Jayaprakash. In the early 2000s, Gnanavel and Jayaprakash moved to create GJ Combines.

Soon after the surprise success of the adolescent-themed Thulluvadho Ilamai (2002), Roja Combines agreed terms with the film's lead actors Dhanush and Sherin to make a film for the studio during October 2002. A project titled Ennai Mattum Kaadhal Pannu by Boopathy Pandian began thereafter but was later put on hold after Dhanush became busy with other ventures. Eventually, the film was relaunched with Dhanush and Sridevi Vijayakumar as Devathayai Kanden (2005).

In 2003, Roja Combines produced a live stage show in the United Arab Emirates called Tamil Mega Star Night 2003. The studio's collaboration with Ajith Kumar in Jana (2004) was the studio's biggest failure, and the makers lost 8 crore rupees. In 2005, following Kaja Mydeen's suicide attempt and bankruptcy, he subsequently dropped himself from producing Gautham Vasudev Menon's Vettaiyaadu Vilaiyaadu (2006) starring Kamal Haasan and chose to release his other ongoing project Perarasu starring Vijayakanth.

In 2010, Kaja Mydeen was approached to act in Sasikumar's Easan, but eventually did not feature. By the mid-2010s, the studio remained largely inactive owing to the rising costs of operating in the Tamil film industry.

Personal life
Kaja Mydeen married actress Sindhuja, who had appeared in the film Sundara Kandam (1992). Post-marriage, Sindhuja converted to Islam and changed her name to K. Aysha, becoming a co-producer on several of Roja Combines' films.

In July 2005, Kaja Mydeen attempted suicide by consuming sleeping pills. It was reported that he was experiencing a grave financial situation which had been caused by box office failures and expensive international stage shows. He survived but became bankrupt, and stopped financing big films.

Mohideen's niece Hrithika began her acting career in 2018, through a film titled Vidyaadha Iravondru Vendum.

Filmography

References 

Film distributors of India
Film production companies based in Chennai
Indian film studios
1996 establishments in Tamil Nadu
Mass media companies established in 1996
Indian companies established in 1996